Presidential elections were held in Lithuania in June 2004 alongside European elections. They were held following the impeachment of President Rolandas Paksas, who was elected in January 2003.

Background
Paksas was impeached for allegedly leaking classified material, and granting citizenship to Russian businessman Jurij Borisov in exchange for financial support. The Constitutional Court of Lithuania ruled that Paksas could not seek re-election as president. In accordance with the constitution, the speaker of parliament, Artūras Paulauskas, became acting president pending new elections.

Candidates
The candidates for the presidency were Adamkus, who had been President from 1998 to 2003 and who was running as an independent, Prunskienė of the Peasants and New Democratic Party Union (VNDS), Vilija Blinkevičiūtė of the New Union (Social Liberals) (NS), Petras Auštrevičius (independent), and Česlovas Juršėnas of the Social Democratic Party (LSDP).

Prunskienė was also supported by the Liberal Democratic Party, while Auštrevičius was supported by the Homeland Union, Lithuanian Christian Democrats, Liberal and Centre Union and Labour Party.

Results
In the first round on 13 June, former President, Valdas Adamkus, led the vote tally over the former Prime Minister Kazimira Prunskienė. Adamkus defeated Prunskienė in the second round on 27 June.

References

External links
2004 Lithuanian presidential elections VRK 

Lithuania
Presidential election
Presidential elections in Lithuania